Kagulu may be,

Kagulu language, Tanzania
Kagulu Hill, Uganda
Kagulu of Buganda